Omorgus carinicollis is a species of hide beetle in the subfamily Omorginae.

References

carinicollis
Beetles described in 1986